Ilyas ibn Asad (died 856) was a Samanid ruler of Herat (819–856). He was one of the four sons of Asad.

In 819 Ilyas was granted authority over the city of Herat by Caliph Al-Ma'mun's governor of Khorasan, Ghassan ibn 'Abbad, as a reward for his support against the rebel Rafi' ibn Laith. Unlike his other three brothers, Ilyas was not given a city in Transoxiana. When he died in 856, control of Herat was given to his son Ibrahim.

Sources
 

856 deaths
Samanids
Year of birth unknown
9th-century Iranian people